James "Jambo" Bolton is a fictional character from the British Channel 4 soap opera Hollyoaks, played by Will Mellor. He first appeared as an original character in 1995, before leaving in 1998. In 2004, Mellor reprised his role briefly for a Christmas special episode.

The word "Jambo" comes from a greeting in the Swahili language.

Characterisation
Jambo is described as having an "idiosyncratic approach to life - he disliked convention and had a naturally inquisitive mind, often pondering on life's little mysteries, such as the theory of tumbling toast". Liverpool Echo described him as "the happy-go-lucky jack-the-lad with an eye for the ladies".

Storylines
Jambo was an individualist, putting his unique stamp on anything that came his way, from his formula for salty vinegar and his devotion to Margaret the cow. Jambo had a penchant for climbing through windows, yet, as he argued, "Why walk round to the door when the window is right in front of you?". Jambo was good friends with Kurt Benson and Tony Hutchinson and, whilst they were often confused by his odd behaviour, the three formed a strong bond, providing one another with support and, very often, humour needed to get through their rather tumultuous lives.

Meanwhile, Kurt was soon paired off with Ruth Osborne and Tony was hopelessly in love with Julie Matthews. Jambo was often left on the sidelines, unlucky in love and unable to act on the feelings he had for Dawn Cunningham. After countless missed opportunities as well as Jambo's brief relationship with Carol Groves’s sister, Anita and his stepmother Lisa, Dawn and Jambo finally admitted their feelings for each other. The other woman in Jambo’s life was his Bond Bug Beryl, whom he loved and cherished almost as much as Dawn. Tragically, Jambo's romance with Dawn was short-lived, as she was diagnosed with leukaemia. She eventually lost her battle against the disease, leaving Jambo devastated over the loss of his girl he wanted more than anything else in the world. Jambo never got over the death of Dawn and, although he tried to persevere with his new landscaping business, '‘Dig It!’, he decided that there were too many memories of Dawn in Hollyoaks and he wanted to move on.

However, Jambo certainly left the female population of Hollyoaks with a memory they would cherish, when he was the unwilling stripper at Jude's opening night at the Parkers. Jambo finally bid farewell to Hollyoaks to begin a new life in Anglesey in 1998 but made one final visit to Hollyoaks to put flowers on Dawn's grave and vowed never to return. Jambo reappeared when the gang went to a trip to Anglesey to visit him.

At Christmas 2004, Jambo reappeared as a vision to Tony Hutchinson in a unique take on A Christmas Carol. Tony later confirmed that it was just as vision, not a ghost, and that he had contacted Jambo in Anglesey who was very much alive.

Jambo hasn't been seen since, although in October 2007, Tina McQueen threw a surprise birthday party for her brother-in-law Tony. She invited all the people in his address book, including Jambo. Tony later told Izzy he had known about the party all along because Jambo had sent him a text saying, "Thanks for the invitation to your surprise birthday party, Tony, sorry I can't make it.".

Reception
On the character Sky said "Way hey... it's Jambo Bolton, do you remember his earring? He was one of the originals and also one of our faves". What's on TV placed him in their list of "The Top 100 Soap Hunks of All Time". Elizabeth Joyce of the Shropshire Star said that Jambo was a "decent" and "genuinely memorable character" who still holds "a place in the heart of many a late-twentysomething".

References

External links
 Character profile  on the E4 website 

Hollyoaks characters
Television characters introduced in 1995
Male characters in television